The Himachal Pradesh Legislative Assembly or the Himachal Pradesh Vidhan Sabha is the unicameral legislature of the Indian state of Himachal Pradesh. The present strength of the Vidhan Sabha is 68. The members of the Tenth Legislative Assembly were elected in the 2003 Himachal Pradesh Legislative Assembly election.

Members of the Assembly

Notes
Shri Chander Kumar resigned from Himachal Pradesh Legislative Assembly after being elected to Lok Sabha.
Dr. Harbans Singh Rana was elected in the by-election from the seat vacated by Shri Chander Kumar.
Shri Prem Kumar Dhumal resigned from H.P. Legislative Assembly after being elected to Lok Sabha from Hamirpur Parliamentary Constituency in a by-election in May 2007.
Major Vijay Singh Mankotia resigned from the H.P. Legislative Assembly in August 2007.
Shri Bodh Raj was unseated by a Supreme Court judgement dated 30-11-2007.

See also
Government of Himachal Pradesh
2003 Himachal Pradesh Legislative Assembly election

References

Himachal Pradesh Legislative Assembly